Axelina Johansson (born 20 April 2000) is a Swedish track and field athlete who competes in shot put.

Career 
Johansson threw 16.52m and finished 11th competing for the University of Nebraska at the  2022 NCAA Division I Indoor Track and Field Championships. Johansson threw 17.30m to finish third at the 2022 Big Ten Indoor Championships shot put. 

As the 2022 Collegiate season moved outdoors, Johansson threw a personal best 18.39m to finish runner up in the shot put at the Big Ten Outdoor Championships. Johansson was subsequently honoured with the Big Ten Women's Outdoor Freshman of the Year award. 

Johansson finished third at the 2022 NCAA Division I Outdoor Track and Field Championships after throwing 18.06m at Hayward Field in Eugene, Oregon. Johansson also competed in Eugene, Oregon at the 2022 World Athletics Championships where she landed a new personal best throw 18.57m to reach the final of the women's shot put before ultimately finishing in twelfth place. Johansson went to Munich to compete in the 2022 European Athletics Championships – Women's shot put and reached the final, finishing seventh with a first round throw of 18.04 which she never bettered.

References

External Links

 2000 births
Living people
Swedish female shot putters
21st-century Swedish women